The Coneheads are a fictional family of extraterrestrials with bald conical heads, created for a series of recurring sketches on Saturday Night Live (SNL).  They first appeared on the January 15, 1977 episode hosted by Ralph Nader (episode 35: season 2 episode 11). They are portrayed by Dan Aykroyd as father Beldar, Jane Curtin as mother Prymaat, and Laraine Newman as daughter Connie. In 1993, they appeared in a feature film.

Summary
The Coneheads are natives of the planet Remulak, stranded on Earth. Their distinguishing feature is the tops of their heads, shaped like large, bald cones. The father's name is Beldar; his wife is Prymaat, and their teenage daughter is Connie. Beldar and Prymaat sometimes use the pseudonyms Fred and Joyce. Beldar states his occupation as "timekeeper of Remulak"; this means he is a spy tasked with alerting his home planet to the optimum time for an invasion of Earth, which he fails to do. Connie is assimilating with Earthlings through association with her peers at school, and some family stress is caused by her desire to live as a typical Earth teenager. Beldar gives his family a cover story to explain their strange behavior by saying that they are "from France".

Sources of humor
The characters' humor derives from three sources: 1) their manner of speech; 2) their strange behavior; and 3) the casual acceptance of the first two by their neighbors and associates, who never seem to catch on that they are extraterrestrials.

Manner of speech
The Coneheads speak in a very fast, nasal monotone. Their speech is characterized by the failure to understand idioms used by native English speakers, and their unnecessarily formal use of the language. They refer to food as "consumables", and say "I summon you" when asking to speak to another person. The adults refer to Connie as "the young one" and themselves as her "parental units". They will say "Maintain low tones!" (one of their catchphrases) when voices rise in heated family discussions. They use the word "Mebs!" as an expletive when highly upset.

Strange behavior
The Coneheads have much larger appetites than Earthlings, eating large amounts of food during meals (which they identify by another one of their catchphrases, "consuming mass quantities"). They drink entire six-packs of beer at once, and smoke whole packs of cigarettes at a time. On the 1977 Halloween episode (October 29), a neighbor complains about their choice of trick-or-treat handouts: beer and fried eggs. They also consume substances and items inedible to Earthlings, such as cleaning fluid, pencil shavings, and fiberglass insulation.

Coneheads have sex by rubbing their cones together and placing "senso-rings" over them. When the neighbors bring a dessert coffee ring to a dinner invitation, Beldar, who takes it to be an edible senso-ring, grabs it and shouts, "No! Not in front of the young ones!"

Conceptual origins
Dan Aykroyd said he was inspired to create the Coneheads by marijuana consumption and based the characters' appearance on the Moai, the mysterious and ancient stone statues of Easter Island, which have similarly conical heads, and the people of the land of Points from Harry Nilsson's fable The Point!. Dan Aykroyd also mentioned in an interview that he drew inspiration from the film This Island Earth where the very tall foreheads of the aliens go largely unnoticed by humans.

Music
Frank Zappa wrote a song based on the sketches, titled "Conehead". It appeared on his 1981 album You Are What You Is. When he hosted SNL, Zappa also appeared in a Coneheads sketch as a man dating Connie, where he makes note that he prefers French women.

Adaptations
The concept was turned into a Rankin/Bass animated special, The Coneheads, in 1983, with Aykroyd, Curtin and Newman reprising their roles. 

A live-action film, Coneheads, released in 1993, starring Aykroyd and Curtin. Michelle Burke took over the role of Connie in the film, with Newman appearing as Connie's aunt on Remulak. Marvel Comics produced a comic book limited series, with all-original stories set after the events of the film. The feature film was licensed to Playmates Toys and a line of action figures was created, designed by the development team from Pangea Corporation. The film was a box office disaster.

SNL appearances
January 15, 1977: The Coneheads at Home (Host: Ralph Nader)
February 26, 1977: The Coneheads at Home (Host: Steve Martin)
March 26, 1977: The Farbers Meet The Coneheads (Host: Jack Burns)
April 16, 1977: The Coneheads At Home (Host: Elliott Gould)
May 21, 1977: Return Of The Coneheads (Host: Buck Henry)
October 29, 1977: Return Of The Coneheads (Host: Charles Grodin)
January 21, 1978: Family Feud (Host: Steve Martin)
March 18, 1978: The Coneheads On Earth (Host: Jill Clayburgh)
May 13, 1978: Cone Encounters Of The Third Kind (Host: Richard Dreyfuss)
October 21, 1978: The Coneheads At Home (Host: Frank Zappa)
February 24, 1979: The Coneheads At The Movies (Host: Kate Jackson)

Source:

Licensed usage

As of late May 2015, State Farm Insurance created a Coneheads version of its commercial "State of Unrest," in which Dan Aykroyd and Jane Curtin reprise their Coneheads roles and put a Coneheads spin on the original commercial that features a husband calling the State Farm 24-hour policy line, while his wife is sure he is talking to his mistress despite his protests that he is talking to State Farm. A second Conehead State Farm commercial is set on their spaceship.  When the microwave breaks, the Coneheads (Aykroyd, Curtin and Newman) invoke their State Farm representative by singing the company's jingle.  The agent assures them they saved money on their policy, but then notices they are in space and not in France, where the Coneheads are supposedly from, so the Coneheads sing the jingle again, but add "in France!" and they all end up sitting at a table outside a French bistro, with the Eiffel Tower in the background.

The Coneheads are the fourth SNL sketch to appear in State Farm commercials, following the Richmeister, the Super Fans, and Hans and Franz.

See also
 Recurring Saturday Night Live characters and sketches

References

External links
Transcript of SNL sketch, Season 3, Episode 15

Saturday Night Live sketches
Saturday Night Live in the 1970s
Topcraft
Science fiction television characters
Extraterrestrial characters in television
Fictional immigrants to the United States
Fictional families
Television characters introduced in 1977
Works by Dan Aykroyd